Furacopyge is a genus of trilobites in the order Phacopida (family Dalmanitidae), that existed during the lower Devonian in what is now Spain. It was described by Arbizu in 1978, and the type species is Furacopyge progenitor. The type locality was Complejo de Ranaces.

References

External links
 Furacopyge at the Paleobiology Database

Dalmanitidae
Phacopida genera
Fossil taxa described in 1978
Devonian trilobites of Europe
Fossils of Spain